戶籍, 户籍, or 戸籍 means household register or family register in Chinese characters, and may also refer to:

Hojeok or Hoju (戶主), a family register system in both North and South Korea
Huji or Hukou system (户口), the system of residency permits in mainland China and Taiwan
Koseki, a Japanese family registry